Headline Hunters is a 1968 British children's drama film starring Leonard Brockwell, Susan Payne, Stephen Garlick, Bill Owen, David Lodge and Frank Williams.

Plot
A bunch of kids help run the local newspaper after their father becomes ill. In the process they foil a robbery at a local factory.

Cast
Leonard Brockwell as Terry Hunter
Susan Payne as Joan Hunter
Stephen Garlick as Peter Hunter
Jeffrey Chandler as Alec
Bill Owen as Henry
Reginald Marsh as Bogshot
Keith Smith as Fustwick
Glyn Houston as Gresham
David Lodge as Harry
Dermot Kelly as Ernie
Frank Williams as Carter
Malcolm Epstein as Percy
David Beale as Hunter
Maureen O'Reilly as Mrs. Hunter

Critical reception
TV Guide noted "Definitely for the younger viewer."

References

External links

1968 films
1968 drama films
Films about journalism
Children's Film Foundation
British children's drama films
1960s children's films
Films about the mass media in the United Kingdom
1960s English-language films
1960s British films